Katie Madonna Lee is an American screenwriter and filmmaker. She is the creator of the show Flabulous, winner of Outstanding Theme Song and Comedy Ensemble at the Los Angeles Web Series Festival in 2012.

Lee's feature film The Execution of Julie Ann Mabry won several awards, including the Women in Film and Television award, the Christopher Award, and the Best Narrative Feature at the LA Femme Festival.  She also co-produced the original musical track Coming Home written by Jeremy Joyce and performed by Sharon Van Etten.

Lee is the founder and developer of the GLBT History Collection at Indiana University-South Bend, one of only three GLBT Collections in the State of Indiana. The collection covers the roots of GLBT activism in South Bend, Indiana through personal items, letters and oral histories.

References

External links
 

American filmmakers
Living people
Year of birth missing (living people)
People from South Bend, Indiana